A Home at the End of the World is a 1990 novel by American author Michael Cunningham.

The book is narrated in the first person, with the narrator changing in each chapter. Bobby and Jonathan are the main narrators, but several chapters are narrated by Alice, Jonathan's mother, and Clare. An excerpt from A Home at the End of the World was published in The New Yorker, chosen for Best American Short Stories 1989, and featured on NPR's Selected Shorts.

Plot summary
Bobby had grown up in a home in suburban Cleveland, Ohio during the 1960s and 1970s where partying and drugs were a recurring theme.  He has already witnessed the death of his mother and beloved older brother by the time he befriends Jonathan, who comes from a sheltered family.  After Bobby finds his father is dead, Jonathan's family takes him in.

Bobby and Jonathan become best friends, and also experiment sexually. The two eventually lose touch, but meet up again in their 20s in 1980s New York, where Bobby moves in with Jonathan and his eccentric roommate Clare. Clare had planned to have a baby with Jonathan (who is openly gay), but Bobby and Clare become lovers, while Jonathan still has feelings for Bobby. Clare and Bobby have a baby and move to a country home together with Jonathan.

The trio form their own family, questioning traditional definitions of family and love, while dealing with the complications of their polyamourous relationship.

Adaptations 

 A Home at the End of the World (2004), film directed by Michael Mayer

External links 

 

1990 American novels
American novels adapted into films
Farrar, Straus and Giroux books
Novels by Michael Cunningham
Novels set in New York (state)
Novels with gay themes
1990s LGBT novels
Works originally published in The New Yorker
American LGBT novels